Growth hormone secretagogue receptor(GHS-R), also known as ghrelin receptor, is a G protein-coupled receptor that binds growth hormone secretagogues (GHSs), such as ghrelin, the "hunger hormone". The role of GHS-R is thought to be in regulating energy homeostasis and body weight. In the brain, they are most highly expressed in the hypothalamus, specifically the ventromedial nucleus and arcuate nucleus. GSH-Rs are also expressed in other areas of the brain, including the ventral tegmental area, hippocampus, and substantia nigra. Outside the central nervous system, too, GSH-Rs are also found in the liver, in skeletal muscle, and even in the heart.

Structure

Two identified transcript variants are expressed in several tissues and are evolutionary conserved in fish and swine. One transcript, 1a, excises an intron and encodes the functional protein; this protein is the receptor for the ghrelin ligand and defines a neuroendocrine pathway for growth hormone release. The second transcript (1b) retains the intron and does not function as a receptor for ghrelin; however, it may function to attenuate activity of isoform 1a.

GHS-R1a falls into G-protein-coupled receptor (GPCR) family. Previous studies have shown that GPCRs can form heterodimers, or functional receptor pairs with other types of G-protein coupled receptors (GPCRs). Various studies suggest that GHS-R1a specifically forms dimers with the following hormone and neurotransmitter receptors: somatostatin receptor 5, dopamine receptor type 2 (DRD2), melanocortin-3 receptor (MC3R), and serotonin receptor type 2C (5-HT2c receptor). See "Function" section below for details on the purported functions of these heterodimers.

Function

Growth hormone release 

The binding of ghrelin to GHS-R1a in pituitary cells stimulates the secretion of growth hormone (GH) by the pituitary gland.

Constitutive activity 

One important feature of GHS-R1a is that there is still some activity in the receptor even when it is not actively being stimulated. This is called constitutive activity, and it means that the receptor is always "on," unless acted on by an inverse agonist. This constitutive activity seems to provide a tonic signal required for the development of normal height, probably through an effect on the GH axis. In fact, some GHS-R1a genetic variations, caused by single nucleotide polymorphisms (SNPs), have been found to be associated with hereditary obesity and others with hereditary short stature. It was also found that, when GHS-R1A constitutive activity was diminished, there were decreased levels of hunger-inducing hormone neuropeptide Y (NPY) as well as in food intake and body weight.

Intracellular signaling mechanisms 

When growth hormone secretagogue receptor is activated, a variety of different intracellular signaling cascades can result, depending on the cell type in which the receptor is expressed. These intracellular signaling cascades include mitogen-activated protein kinase (MAPK)), protein kinase A (PKA), protein kinase B (PKB), also known as AKT), and AMP Activated Protein Kinase (AMPK) cascades.

Behavioral reinforcement of food intake 

It is well-characterized that activating the growth hormone secretagogue receptor with ghrelin induces an orexigenic state, or general feeling of hunger. However, ghrelin may also play a role in behavioral reinforcement. Studies in animal models, found that food intake increased when ghrelin was specifically administered to just the ventral tegmental area (VTA), a brain area that uses dopamine signaling to reinforce behavior. In fact, the more ghrelin administered, the more food the rodent consumed. This is called a dose-dependent effect. Building on this, it was found that there are growth hormone secretagogue receptors in the VTA and that ghrelin acts on the VTA through these receptors. Current studies, furthermore, suggest that the VTA may contain dimers of GHS-R1a and dopamine receptor type 2 (DRD2). If these two receptors do indeed form dimers, this would somehow link ghrelin signaling to dopaminergic signaling.

Enhancement of learning and memory 

The growth hormone secretagogue receptor may also be linked to learning and memory. First of all, the receptor is found in the hippocampus, the brain region responsible for long-term memory. Second, it was found that specifically activating the receptor in just the hippocampus increased both long-term potentiation (LTP) and dendritic spine density, two cellular phenomena thought to be involved in learning. Third, short-term calorie restriction, defined as a 30% reduction in caloric intake for two weeks, which naturally increases ghrelin levels and thus activates the receptor, was found to increase both performance on spatial learning tasks as well as neurogenesis in the adult hippocampus.

Selective ligands 
A range of selective ligands for the GHS-R receptor are now available and are being developed for several clinical applications. GHS-R agonists have appetite-stimulating and growth hormone-releasing effects, and are likely to be useful for the treatment of muscle wasting and frailty associated with old-age and degenerative diseases. On the other hand, GHS-R antagonists have anorectic effects and are likely to be useful for the treatment of obesity.

Agonists 

 Adenosine
 Alexamorelin
 Anamorelin
 Capromorelin
 CP-464709
 Cortistatin-14
 Examorelin (hexarelin)
 Ghrelin (lenomorelin)
 GHRP-1
 GHRP-3
 GHRP-4
 GHRP-5
 GHRP-6
 Ibutamoren (MK-677)
 Ipamorelin
 L-692,585
 LY-426410
 LY-444711
 Macimorelin
 Pralmorelin (GHRP-2)
 Relamorelin
 SM-130,686
 Tabimorelin
 Ulimorelin

Antagonists
 A-778,193
 PF-5190457

References

Further reading

External links 
 
 
 Ghrelin at Colorado State University

G protein-coupled receptors